Paraíso (English: Paradise City) is a Brazilian telenovela produced and broadcast by TV Globo from March 16 to October 2, 2009.

Cast

Awards 
Premio Tudo De Bom - Jornal O Dia (2009)
 Best actress - Cássia Kiss

Melhores do Ano - 2009
 Best actor - Eriberto Leão

See also 
 List of TV Globo telenovelas

References

External links 
  
 

2009 telenovelas
Brazilian telenovelas
TV Globo telenovelas
2009 Brazilian television series debuts
2009 Brazilian television series endings
Portuguese-language telenovelas